Abdullah bin Jassim bin Mohammed Al Thani ( "Abdullah bin Jassim bin Mohammed Al Thani"), also known as Sheikh Abdullah bin Jassim Al Thani or Sheikh Abdullah bin Qassim Al Thani, was the Emir of Qatar. He was born in 1880 in Doha, the capital city of Qatar. He then abdicated in favour of his crown prince and second son, Sheikh Hamad bin Abdullah Al Thani, in 1940. Sheikh Hamad died eight years later and Sheikh Abdullah assumed office once again until 1949, when he stepped down from office in favour for his eldest son, Sheikh Ali bin Abdullah Al Thani. Oil was also discovered for the first time during his rule.

Biography

Early life and reign

Sheikh Abdullah bin Jassim Al Thani was born in the year 1880, in Doha, the capital city and state of Qatar, as a son of Sheikh Jassim bin Mohammed Al Thani. Although his mother is still unknown, he was born along with his eighteen siblings, with him being the 5th eldest among his siblings. He then ruled Qatar until 1940. Sheikh Abdullah's heir apparent, Sheikh Hamad bin Abdullah Al Thani, ruled Qatar from 1940 until his early death in 1948. Sheikh Abdullah became the ruler of Qatar once again until 1949, when he abdicated in favour of his eldest son. Sheikh Ali bin Abdullah Al Thani, his eldest son, then ruled Qatar after his father's abdication.

Contributions

Ottoman Empire and Great Britain era

Great Britain and the Ottoman Empire accorded their recognition to Sheikh Abdullah and his successors' right to rule over the whole of the Qatari Peninsula. The Ottomans renounced all their rights to Qatar and following the outbreak of the First World War; Sheikh Abdullah forced the Ottomans to abandon Doha on 19 August 1915.

Treaties for protection

On 3 November 1916, Britain, to bring Qatar under its Trucial System of Administration, signed a treaty with Sheikh Abdullah. While Sheikh Abdullah agreed not to enter into any relations with any other power without prior consent of the British Government, Percy Zachariah Cox, the Political Resident in the Persian Gulf, who signed the treaty on behalf of his government, guaranteed the protection of Qatar 'from all aggression by sea'.
On 5 May 1935, Sheikh Abdullah was able to obtain Britain's agreement for the protection of Qatar from inside as well as any attacks from external forces.

Structures built

In 1927, Sheikh Abdullah built the Al Koot Fort, also known as Doha Fort, in the Al Bidda neighbourhood, in the midst of Souq Waqif, near Doha Corniche, in Doha, the capital city and state of Qatar, to serve as a police station, at the same time, to protect the Souq Waqif from thieves.
In 1938, Sheikh Abdullah built the famous Zubarah Fort, in the town of Zubarah, which in turn, is located in the Al Shamal municipality, on the northwestern coast of the Qatari peninsula, about 105 km from Doha.

Discovery of oil

Following British recognition of Sheikh Hamad, the second son of Sheikh Abdullah as the Heir Apparent of Qatar, Sheikh Abdullah signed the first Oil Concession Agreement with the Anglo-Persian Oil Company on 17 May 1935. Accordingly, in October 1938, drilling of the first well in Qatar began and the discovery of oil was made at Dukhan structure in January 1940. However, the oil wells were capped as the Second World War progressed.
Sheikh Abdullah's last act as ruler was the signing of a Seabed Concession with Central Mining and Investment Corporation Ltd. on 5 August 1949. He died on 25 April 1957.

Appointment of the next Emir

On 30 June 1948, Sheikh Abdullah appointed Sheikh Ali Bin Abdullah Al-Thani as the Deputy Ruler of Qatar, following the death of Sheikh Hamad on 27 May 1948, and after abdicating for his eldest son.

Marriage and children

Although Sheikh Abdullah's first wife is Sheikha Maryam bint Abdullah Al Attiyah, he further married a second wife named Sheikha Fatima bint Isa Al Thani, daughter of Sheikh Isa bin Thamer Al Thani, to whom he bore his third son, Sheikh Hassan bin Abdullah Al Thani. In total, Sheikh Abdullah bin Jassim Al Thani had three sons.

Sheikh Ali bin Abdullah Al Thani
Sheikh Hamad bin Abdullah Al Thani
Sheikh Hassan bin Abdullah Al Thani

Death

Sheikh Abdullah bin Jassim Al Thani died on 25 April 1957 by a natural death. But before he died, he appointed his eldest son as the ruler of the Qatar Peninsula as a whole in 1949.

See also
Jassim bin Mohammed Al Thani
Al Koot Fort
Zubarah Fort
Percy Cox

References

External links
Amiri Diwan
Al Thani Family Tree
Qatari Ministry of the Interior

1880 births
1957 deaths
Abdullah bin Jassim
Emirs of Qatar
20th-century Arabs